Portsmith is a suburb of Cairns in the Cairns Region, Queensland, Australia.

History 
Portsmith is situated in the Yidinji traditional Aboriginal country.  The origin of the suburb name is from an early pioneer named William Smith.

Geography 

The suburb consists of two distinct areas: the north-western part which is the mainland (adjacent with suburbs Woree, Bungalow, Parramatta Park and Cairns City) and the south-eastern part which is a pair of islands (Admiralty Island and a smaller unnamed island) bounded to the west by Smiths Creek and to the east by Trinity Inlet. The mainland part is developed land while the islands are undeveloped. The entire suburb is flat low-lying land, less than 10 metres above sea level.

The mainland part is principally used for industrial purposes with those nearest Smiths Creek being used for maritime purposes such as boat building, shipping services, trawlers and fish markets.

Ray Jones Drive/Bruce Highway is an arterial road that runs from the south-west to the north-east through the mainland area (being known at the north-east end as Comport Street). The North Coast railway line runs south and roughly parallel with the arterial road with the Portsmith railway station and Portsmith railway yards serving the suburb.

Education 
There are no schools in Portsmith. The nearest government primary schools are Parramatta State School in neighbouring Parramatta Park to the north and Balaclava State School in Mooroobool to the north-west. The nearest government secondary school is Trinity Bay State High School in Manunda to the north.

References

External links